Day After Day is a Canadian short documentary film, directed by Clément Perron for the National Film Board of Canada and released in 1962. 

The film documents the routines of working-class life in a small paper mill town in Quebec, using experimental sound and film editing techniques to establish how much the town's public life is defined by the repetitive rhythms of the machines in the mill.

The film won two Canadian Film Awards at the 15th Canadian Film Awards, for Best Arts and Experimental Film and Best Black-and-White Cinematography (Guy Borremans).

References

External links
 

1962 films
1962 documentary films
1962 short films
Canadian short documentary films
Films directed by Clément Perron
National Film Board of Canada documentaries
National Film Board of Canada short films
Films about labour
French-language Canadian films
Canadian black-and-white films
1960s Canadian films